Vyt may refer to:

 Vyt-lès-Belvoir, a commune in France
 Vyt Bakaitis (born 1940), American translator, editor, and poet
 Charles Vyt (1914–?), Belgian pentathlete

VYT may stand for:
 Valley Youth Theatre, in Arizona, US
  Victorian Youth Theatre, in Melbourne, Australia

See also 
 Vyts, nickname of Vytautas Beliajus (1908–1994), Lithuanian–American folk dancer